The Copa Rommel Fernández 2013 season (officially "XVII Copa Rommel Fernández") starts on November 17, 2013.

2013 teams

Zone 1
 Panama East Panama West Colon Darien

Zone 2
 Cocle Herrera Los Santos Veraguas

Zone 3
 Chiriquí East Chiriquí West Bocas del Toro

Final Game

Copa Rommel Fernández seasons
3